Geoffrey O'Hara (February 2, 1882 – January 31, 1967) was a Canadian American composer, singer and music professor.

Early life
O'Hara was born in Chatham, Ontario, Canada. He initially planned a military career. O'Hara entered the Royal Military College of Canada in Kingston, Ontario at age 18 and he trained with the 1st Hussars. He had to abandon his military career upon the death of his father, Robert O'Hara.

Career
He moved to the United States in 1904, the same year he began performing in Vaudeville. He began recording for Edison Records in 1905. In 1913 O'Hara undertook the recording of traditional Indian songs on behalf of the American government. He was recorded on phonograph cylinder lecturing about the complexity of the music as well as singing and playing several types of Navajo traditional songs in 1914. During World War I, he was a singing instructor of patriotic songs for American troops.

O'Hara lectured on music and songwriting, and held positions at Teachers' College of Columbia University (1936–37), Huron College and the University of South Dakota, where he later received and honorary Doctor of Music degree in 1947. He lectured for the remainder of his life. In 1920, O'Hara helped organize The Composers' and Lyric Writers' Protective League. He also was a board member of the American Society of Composers, Authors, and Publishers (ASCAP), was the president of the Composers-Authors Guild, and served in the United Service Organizations (USO).

He was a National Patron of Delta Omicron, an international professional music fraternity.

Personal life
In 1919, he married Constance Dougherty from Massachusetts, and together they had two children; the same year, he became a naturalized citizen of the United States.

Works
O'Hara composed over 500 popular and patriotic songs, and hymns. He had some moderate popular music hits in the 1910s with songs such as Your Eyes Have Told Me What I Did Not Know (1913), Tennessee, I Hear You Calling Me (1914), The Old Songs, and Over the Top: Military March (1917).

His one huge hit was his song K-K-K-Katy (1918), one of the most popular tunes of the World War I era.  It was sung in both World War I and World War II, occasionally as "K. K. K. K. P."

He was commissioned by the Wilson administration to compose the modern day version of the Star Spangled Banner.

Songs 
 1917 Give a Man a Horse He Can Ride (L: James Thomson)
 1917 Give Three Loud Cheers with Samuel Stewart (L: Edith M. Gibbs)
 1917 Over the Top March
 1917 Send Me a Curl
 1917 Woman Who Waits at Home, The (L: Gordon Johnstone)
 1918 Aw Sammie! (L: H.Sanborn)
 1918 I Don't care Where They Send Me (L: Schuyler Green)
 1918 I Love the merry Merry Sunshine
 1918 K-K-K-Katy
 1918 Over Yonder Where the Lilies Grow
 1918 Patriotism (L: William Horatio Day)
 1918 South Will Do Her Part, The (L: H. Sanborn)
 1919 There Is No Death (L: Gordon Johnstone)
 1920 Get Up and Get Out (L: Gordon Johnstone)

See also

 Music of Canada
 List of Canadian composers

References

Bibliography

External links

Geoffrey O'Hara, composer, singer and lecturer (1882-1967)

 Geoffrey O'Hara recordings at the Discography of American Historical Recordings.

1882 births
1967 deaths
Canadian emigrants to the United States
People from Chatham-Kent
Vaudeville performers
Canadian composers
Canadian male composers
20th-century Canadian male singers